Calumma linotum, commonly known as the blue-nosed chameleon, is a chameleon species endemic to northern Madagascar, and common in the forests of Nosy Be.

Gallery

References

Further reading
Glaw F, Vences M (1994). A Fieldguide to the Amphibians and Reptiles of Madagascar, Second edition. Cologne, Germany: Vences & Glaw Verlag/Serpents Tale. 480 pp. .
Klaver C, Böhme W (1986). "Phylogeny and Classification of the Chamaeleonodae (Sauria), with special reference to hemipenis morphology". Bonn. zool. Monogr. 22: 1-64. (Calumma boettgeri, new combination).

Calumma
Endemic fauna of Madagascar
Reptiles of Madagascar
Reptiles described in 1924
Taxa named by Lorenz Müller